The sulfate minerals are a class of minerals that include the sulfate ion within their structure. The sulfate minerals occur commonly in primary evaporite depositional environments, as gangue minerals in hydrothermal veins and as secondary minerals in the oxidizing zone of sulfide mineral deposits. The chromate and manganate minerals have a similar structure and are often included with the sulfates in mineral classification systems.

Sulfate minerals include:
Anhydrous sulfates
Barite BaSO4
Celestite SrSO4
Anglesite PbSO4
Anhydrite CaSO4
Hanksite Na22K(SO4)9(CO3)2Cl 
Hydroxide and hydrous sulfates
Gypsum CaSO4·2H2O
Chalcanthite CuSO4·5H2O
Kieserite MgSO4·H2O
Starkeyite MgSO4·4H2O
Hexahydrite MgSO4·6H2O
Epsomite MgSO4·7H2O
Meridianiite MgSO4·11H2O
Melanterite FeSO4·7H2O
Antlerite Cu3SO4(OH)4
Brochantite Cu4SO4(OH)6
Alunite KAl3(SO4)2(OH)6
Jarosite KFe3(SO4)2(OH)6

Nickel–Strunz classification -07- sulfates 

IMA-CNMNC proposes a new hierarchical scheme (Mills et al., 2009). This list uses it to modify the Classification of Nickel–Strunz (mindat.org, 10 ed, pending publication).

Abbreviations:
"*" – discredited (IMA/CNMNC status).
"?" – questionable/doubtful (IMA/CNMNC status).
"REE" – Rare-earth element (Sc, Y, La, Ce, Pr, Nd, Pm, Sm, Eu, Gd, Tb, Dy, Ho, Er, Tm, Yb, Lu)
"PGE" – Platinum-group element (Ru, Rh, Pd, Os, Ir, Pt)
03.C Aluminofluorides, 06 Borates, 08 Vanadates (04.H V[5,6] Vanadates), 09 Silicates:
Neso: insular (from Greek νησος nēsos, island)
Soro: grouping (from Greek σωροῦ sōros, heap, mound (especially of corn))
Cyclo: ring
Ino: chain (from Greek ις [genitive: ινος inos], fibre)  
Phyllo: sheet (from Greek φύλλον phyllon, leaf) 
Tekto: three-dimensional framework
Nickel–Strunz code scheme: NN.XY.##x
NN: Nickel–Strunz mineral class number
X: Nickel–Strunz mineral division letter
Y: Nickel–Strunz mineral family letter
##x: Nickel–Strunz mineral/group number, x add-on letter

Class: sulfates, selenates, tellurates 
 07.A Sulfates (selenates, etc.) without Additional Anions, without H2O
 07.AB With medium-sized cations: 05 Millosevichite, 05 Mikasaite; 10 Chalcocyanite, 10 Zincosite*
 07.AC With medium-sized and large cations: IMA2008-029, 05 Vanthoffite; 10 Efremovite, 10 Manganolangbeinite, 10 Langbeinite; 15 Eldfellite, 15 Yavapaiite; 20 Godovikovite, 20 Sabieite; 25 Thenardite, 35 Aphthitalite
 07.AD With only large cations: 05 Arcanite, 05 Mascagnite; 10 Mercallite, 15 Misenite, 20 Letovicite, 25 Glauberite, 30 Anhydrite; 35 Anglesite, 35 Barite, 35 Celestine, 35 Radiobarite*, 35 Olsacherite; 40 Kalistrontite, 40 Palmierite
 07.B Sulfates (selenates, etc.) with additional anions, without H2O
 07.BB With medium-sized cations: 05 Caminite, 10 Hauckite, 15 Antlerite, 20 Dolerophanite, 25 Brochantite, 30 Vergasovaite, 35 Klebelsbergite, 40 Schuetteite, 45 Paraotwayite, 50 Xocomecatlite, 55 Pauflerite
 07.BC With medium-sized and large cations: 05 Dansite; 10 Alunite, 10 Ammonioalunite, 10 Ammoniojarosite, 10 Beaverite, 10 Argentojarosite, 10 Huangite, 10 Dorallcharite, 10 Jarosite, 10 Hydroniumjarosite, 10 Minamiite, 10 Natrojarosite, 10 Natroalunite, 10 Osarizawaite, 10 Plumbojarosite, 10 Walthierite, 10 Schlossmacherite; 15 Yeelimite; 20 Atlasovite, 20 Nabokoite; 25 Chlorothionite; 30 Fedotovite, 30 Euchlorine; 35 Kamchatkite, 40 Piypite; 45 Klyuchevskite-Duplicate, 45 Klyuchevskite, 45 Alumoklyuchevskite; 50 Caledonite, 55 Wherryite, 60 Mammothite; 65 Munakataite, 65 Schmiederite, 65 Linarite; 70 Chenite, 75 Krivovichevite
 07.BD With only large cations: 05 Sulphohalite; 10 Galeite, 10 Schairerite; 15 Kogarkoite; 20 Cesanite, 20 Caracolite; 25 Burkeite, 30 Hanksite, 35 Cannonite, 40 Lanarkite, 45 Grandreefite, 50 Itoite, 55 Chiluite, 60 Hectorfloresite, 65 Pseudograndreefite, 70 Sundiusite
 07.C Sulfates (selenates, etc.) without additional anions, with H2O
 07.CB With only medium-sized cations: 05 Gunningite, 05 Dwornikite, 05 Kieserite, 05 Szomolnokite, 05 Szmikite, 05 Poitevinite, 05 Cobaltkieserite; 07 Sanderite, 10 Bonattite, 15 Boyleite, 15 Aplowite, 15 Ilesite, 15 Rozenite, 15 Starkeyite, 15 IMA2002-034; 20 Chalcanthite, 20 Jokokuite, 20 Pentahydrite, 20 Siderotil; 25 Bianchite, 25 Ferrohexahydrite, 25 Chvaleticeite, 25 Hexahydrite, 25 Moorhouseite, 25 Nickelhexahydrite; 30 Retgersite; 35 Bieberite, 35 Boothite, 35 Mallardite, 35 Melanterite, 35 Zincmelanterite, 35 Alpersite; 40 Epsomite, 40 Goslarite, 40 Morenosite; 45 Alunogen, 45 Meta-alunogen; 50 Coquimbite, 50 Paracoquimbite; 55 Rhomboclase, 60 Kornelite, 65 Quenstedtite, 70 Lausenite; 75 Lishizhenite, 75 Romerite; 80 Ransomite; 85 Bilinite, 85 Apjohnite, 85 Dietrichite, 85 Halotrichite, 85 Pickeringite, 85 Redingtonite, 85 Wupatkiite; 90 Meridianiite, 95 Caichengyunite
 07.CC With medium-sized and large cations: 05 Krausite, 10 Tamarugite; 15 Mendozite, 15 Kalinite; 20 Lonecreekite, 20 Alum-(K), 20 Alum-(Na), 20 Lanmuchangite, 20 Tschermigite; 25 Pertlikite, 25 Monsmedite?, 25 Voltaite, 25 Zincovoltaite; 30 Krohnkite, 35 Ferrinatrite, 40 Goldichite, 45 Loweite; 50 Blodite, 50 Changoite, 50 Nickelblodite; 55 Mereiterite, 55 Leonite; 60 Boussingaultite, 60 Cyanochroite, 60 Mohrite, 60 Picromerite, 60 Nickelboussingaultite; 65 Polyhalite; 70 Leightonite, 75 Amarillite, 80 Konyaite, 85 Wattevilleite
 07.CD With only large cations: 05 Matteuccite, 10 Mirabilite, 15 Lecontite, 20 Hydroglauberite, 25 Eugsterite, 30 Gorgeyite; 35 Koktaite, 35 Syngenite; 40 Gypsum, 45 Bassanite, 50 Zircosulfate, 55 Schieffelinite, 60 Montanite, 65 Omongwaite
 07.D Sulfates (selenates, etc.) with additional anions, with H2O
 07.DB With only medium-sized cations; insular octahedra and finite groups: 05 Svyazhinite, 05 Aubertite, 05 Magnesioaubertite; 10 Rostite, 10 Khademite; 15 Jurbanite; 20 Minasragrite, 20 Anorthominasragrite, 20 Orthominasragrite; 25 Bobjonesite; 30 Amarantite, 30 Hohmannite, 30 Metahohmannite; 35 Aluminocopiapite, 35 Copiapite, 35 Calciocopiapite, 35 Cuprocopiapite, 35 Ferricopiapite, 35 Magnesiocopiapite, 35 Zincocopiapite
 07.DC With only medium-sized cations; chains of corner-sharing octahedra: 05 Aluminite, 05 Meta-aluminite; 10 Butlerite, 10 Parabutlerite; 15 Fibroferrite, 20 Xitieshanite; 25 Botryogen, 25 Zincobotryogen; 30 Chaidamuite, 30 Guildite 
 07.DD With only medium-sized cations; sheets of edge-sharing octahedra: 05 Basaluminite?, 05 Felsobanyaite, 07.5 Kyrgyzstanite, 08.0 Zn-Schulenbergite; 10 Langite, 10 Posnjakite, 10 Wroewolfeite; 15 Spangolite, 20 Ktenasite, 25 Christelite; 30 Campigliaite, 30 Devilline, 30 Orthoserpierite, 30 Niedermayrite, 30 Serpierite; 35 Motukoreaite, 35 Mountkeithite, 35 Glaucocerinite, 35 Honessite, 35 Hydrowoodwardite, 35 Hydrohonessite, 35 Shigaite, 35 Natroglaucocerinite, 35 Wermlandite, 35 Nikischerite, 35 Zincaluminite, 35 Woodwardite, 35 Carrboydite, 35 Zincowoodwardite, 35 Zincowoodwardite-3R, 35 Zincowoodwardite-1T; 40 Lawsonbauerite, 40 Torreyite, 45 Mooreite, 50 Namuwite, 55 Bechererite, 60 Ramsbeckite, 65 Vonbezingite, 70 Redgillite; 75 Chalcoalumite, 75 Nickelalumite*; 80 Guarinoite, 80 Theresemagnanite, 80 Schulenbergite; 85 Montetrisaite
 07.DE With only medium-sized cations; unclassified: 05 Mangazeite; 10 Carbonatecyanotrichite, 10 Cyanotrichite; 15 Schwertmannite, 20 Tlalocite, 25 Utahite, 35 Coquandite, 40 Osakaite, 45 Wilcoxite, 50 Stanleyite, 55 Mcalpineite, 60 Hydrobasaluminite, 65 Zaherite, 70 Lautenthalite, 75 Camérolaite, 80 Brumadoite
 07.DF With large and medium-sized cations: 05 Uklonskovite, 10 Kainite, 15 Natrochalcite; 20 Metasideronatrite, 20 Sideronatrite; 25 Despujolsite, 25 Fleischerite, 25 Schaurteite, 25 Mallestigite; 30 Slavikite, 35 Metavoltine; 40 Lannonite, 40 Vlodavetsite; 45 Peretaite, 50 Gordaite, 55 Clairite, 60 Arzrunite, 65 Elyite, 70 Yecoraite, 75 Riomarinaite, 80 Dukeite, 85 Xocolatlite
 07.DG With large and medium-sized cations; with NO3, CO3, B(OH)4, SiO4 or IO3: 05 Darapskite; 10 Clinoungemachite, 10 Ungemachite, 10 Humberstonite; 15 Bentorite, 15 Charlesite, 15 Ettringite, 15 Jouravskite, 15 Sturmanite, 15 Thaumasite, 15 Carraraite, 15 Buryatite; 20 Rapidcreekite, 25 Tatarskite, 30 Nakauriite, 35 Chessexite; 40 Carlosruizite, 40 Fuenzalidaite; 45 Chelyabinskite*
 07.E Uranyl Sulfates
 07.EA Without cations: 05 Uranopilite, 05 Metauranopilite, 10 Jachymovite
 07.EB With medium-sized cations: 05 Johannite, 10 Deliensite
 07.EC With medium-sized and large cations: 05 Cobaltzippeite, 05 Magnesiozippeite, 05 Nickelzippeite, 05 Natrozippeite, 05 Zinc-zippeite, 05 Zippeite; 10 Rabejacite, 15 Marecottite, 20 Pseudojohannite
 07.J Thiosulfates 
 07.JA Thiosulfates with Pb: 05 Sidpietersite
 07.X Unclassified Strunz Sulfates (Selenates, Tellurates)
 07.XX Unknown: 00 Aiolosite, 00 Steverustite, 00 Grandviewite, 00 IMA2009-008, 00 Adranosite, 00 Blakeite

Class: chromates 
 07.F Chromates
 07.FA Without additional anions: 05 Tarapacaite, 10 Chromatite, 15 Hashemite, 20 Crocoite
 07.FB With additional O, V, S, Cl: 05 Phoenicochroite, 10 Santanaite, 15 Wattersite, 20 Deanesmithite, 25 Edoylerite
 07.FC With PO4, AsO4, SiO4: 05 Vauquelinite; 10 Fornacite, 10 Molybdofornacite; 15 Hemihedrite, 15 Iranite; 20 Embreyite, 20 Cassedanneite;    
 07.FD Dichromates: 05 Lopezite

Class: molybdates, wolframates and niobates 
 07.G Molybdates, wolframates and niobates
 07.GA Without additional anions or H2O: 05 Fergusonite-(Ce), 05 Fergusonite-(Nd)N, 05 Fergusonite-(Y), 05 Powellite, 05 Wulfenite, 05 Stolzite, 05 Scheelite; 10 Formanite-(Y), 10 Iwashiroite-(Y); 15 Paraniite-(Y) 
 07.GB With additional anions and/or H2O: 05 Lindgrenite, 10 Szenicsite, 15 Cuprotungstite, 20 Phyllotungstite, 25 Rankachite, 30 Ferrimolybdite, 35 Anthoinite, 35 Mpororoite, 40 Obradovicite-KCu, 45 Mendozavilite-NaFe, 45 Paramendozavilite, 50 Tancaite-(Ce)
 07.H Uranium and uranyl molybdates and wolframates 
 07.HA With U4+: 05 Sedovite, 10 Cousinite, 15 Moluranite 
 07.HB With U6+: 15 Calcurmolite, 20 Tengchongite, 25 Uranotungstite

References